Klaus Kanz is a former German curler.

He skipped German national men's team on four World championships and two European championships.

Teams

References

External links
 

Living people
German male curlers
Year of birth missing (living people)
Place of birth missing (living people)